Physetica temperata is a species of moth of the family Noctuidae. It is endemic to New Zealand and found in the North Island and the top of the South Island in coastal areas. P. temperata is unlikely to be confused with other species in its range, even though it is not distinctively patterned. It is possible that males might be confused with males of P. homoscia but this latter species is much larger. P. temperata can be distinguished from P. caerulea as the former species has forewing veins that are marked black and a chequered forewing fringe. The adults of this species are on the wing from September to March. The life history of this species has not been well documented although it is thought that larval host species is Ozothamnus leptophyllus.

Taxonomy 
This species was first described by Francis Walker in 1858 and named Bryophila temperata. In the same publication, Walker, thinking he was describing new species also named this species Xylina inceptura and Xylina deceptura. In 1887 Edward Meyrick synonymised these two latter names and placed the species in the name in the Mamestra.  In 1898 George Hudson discussed this species under the name Leucania temperata. In 1905, George Hampson also discussed this species and placed it within the genus Morrisonia. In 1917 Alfred Philpott, thinking he was describing a new species, named it Aletia accurata. In 1927 Meyrick thinking he was describing a new species, named this species Aletia eucrossa. In 1928 Hudson again discussed this moth, but this time under the name Melanchra temperata. In 1988 J. S. Dugdale synonymised the names Aletia accurata and Aletia eucrossa, and placed this species in the genus Aletia. In 2017 Robert Hoare undertook a review of New Zealand Noctuinae and placed this species in the genus Physetica. The female holotype specimen was collected by J. F. Churton, likely in Auckland, and is held at the Natural History Museum, London.

Description 

Walker originally described this species as follows:
The adult male of this species has a wingspan of between 30 and 32 mm whereas the female has a wingspan of between 32 and 35 mm. P. temperata is unlikely to be confused with other species in its range, even though it is not distinctively patterned. It is possible that males might be confused with males of P. homoscia but this latter species is much larger. P. temperata can be distinguished from P. caerulea as the former species has forewing veins that are marked black and a chequered forewing fringe.

Distribution 
This species is endemic to New Zealand. This species can be found in the North Island and in the north parts of the South Island.

Habitat 

This species lives in coastal habitats.

Behaviour 
The adults of this species are on the wing from September to March.

Life history and host plants 
The life history of this species has not been well documented although it is thought that larval host species is Ozothamnus leptophyllus.

References 

Hadeninae
Moths of New Zealand
Endemic fauna of New Zealand
Moths described in 1858
Taxa named by Francis Walker (entomologist)
Endemic moths of New Zealand